36 Hours is a 1965 German-American war suspense film, based on the 1944 short story "Beware of the Dog" by Roald Dahl. The picture stars James Garner, Eva Marie Saint, and Rod Taylor and was directed by George Seaton.  On June 2, 1944, a German army doctor tries to obtain vital information from an American military intelligence officer by convincing him that it is 1950 and World War II is long over.

Plot 
Having attended General Eisenhower's final briefing on the upcoming Normandy landings, U.S. Army Major Jeff Pike is sent to Lisbon, Portugal on June 1, 1944, to meet an informant to confirm that the Nazis still expect the invasion at the Pas de Calais. He is abducted and transported to Germany.

Pike wakes up in what looks like a U.S. Army hospital. His hair is graying, and he needs glasses to read. He is told it is May 1950 and he is in post-war occupied Germany. Psychiatrist Major Walter Gerber explains that Pike has been having episodes of amnesia since he was tortured in Lisbon. He advises Pike that his blocked memories have always resurfaced, helped along by a therapy of remembering events prior to Lisbon and then pushing forward into the blank period. Various props including U.S. Army jeeps and uniforms, baseball, and fake letters, newspaper and radio broadcasts, are used to carefully convince Pike that the year is 1950 and that he is among fellow Americans. He is assisted by a German nurse, the dispassionate Anna Hedler. Pike is taken in by the deception. As part of his "therapy," he recounts the critical details of the invasion plans, including the location and the date, June 5, to his eager listeners.

When Pike notices a nearly invisible paper cut he got the day he left for Lisbon, he realizes that he has been deceived. He confirms it by tricking an "American" soldier into reflexively snapping to attention in the German manner. He confronts Anna, who admits that the date is June 2, 1944. She was recruited from a concentration camp because she was a nurse and spoke English.

Pike instructs Anna to tell Gerber that he was onto the plot, while he makes a feeble attempt to escape. Quickly recaptured, he states that he realized what was going on soon after waking up due to his paper cut. Gerber does not believe him. After two days of interrogation, however, Pike and Anna convince SS agent Schack, who never believed the deception would work. Schack is sure the invasion will be at the Pas de Calais. Gerber, however, sets the clock forward in Pike and Anna's room so they think it is the morning of June 5, then states that the Germans have been surprised at Normandy. Pike lets his guard down and confirms it. Gerber sends an emergency dispatch, but the weather on June 5 is so bad that Eisenhower postpones the invasion a day (which actually occurred). By midday June 5, Gerber has been discredited and Schack orders his arrest.

Gerber knows that Schack will kill them to cover his own blunder when the Allies do finally land at Normandy. Gerber helps Anna and Pike escape, asking Pike to take his groundbreaking research on amnesiacs with him. When the invasion begins the next morning, he laughs at Schack when he arrives, revealing that he has taken poison and pointing out that Schack will likely be liquidated. Schack pursues the escapees on his own, too hurried to wait for troops.

The couple flee to a local minister who (Pike knows) had helped downed RAF pilots escape to nearby Switzerland. The minister is away, but his housekeeper Elsa introduces them to a jovially corrupt German border guard, Sgt. Ernst Furzen. Pike and Anna bribe him with his watch and her rings to get them across the border. Furzen gives Elsa one of the rings. Schack shows up at the minister's after Furzen and the couple have left for the border — he recognizes Anna's ring on Elsa’s finger and forces her to reveal where they have gone. Schack catches up at the border, but Furzen shoots him and arranges Schack’s body to make it look as if he had been killed while trying to escape himself.

Safely in Switzerland, Pike and Anna are put in separate cars. Anna cries as they part, her first display of emotion in years.

Cast

In addition, James Doohanstill a year away from taking on the role of Montgomery "Scotty" Scott in the television series Star Trekmakes a brief uncredited appearance as Bishop, clerk to the Colonel MacLean character.

Production
Most of the film was shot in Yosemite National Park. Exterior shots were filmed at the Wawona Hotel near the entrance of Yosemite National Park.

Reception

Critical
The New Yorker called the film an "ingenious thriller" and praised Garner, Saint, and Taylor for being "plausible in highly implausible roles."

In the opinion of The New York Times critic Bosley Crowther, "What is annoying about this picture is that the set-up for pulling off the plot is just too slick and artificial, too patly and elaborately contrived. ... Even though Mr. Seaton has done a thorough and careful job of staging this massive deception and has got his able cast to play it with reasonable assurance, it has such a synthetic look and, indeed, the idea is so theatrical that the whole thing rings curiously false."

Garner wrote in his memoirs that he felt "the movie doesn't work because there's no suspense; everybody knew that in real life the D-Day invasion was a success and that we'd won the war", but he did enjoy working with Saint and George Seaton.

Background

Banner's role, which provided the comedy relief in 36 Hours, was the role model for his easy-going German soldier, POW camp guard Sgt. Hans Schultz, in the TV series Hogan's Heroes (1965–71). Coincidentally, Sig Ruman played a similar POW camp guard named Sgt. Schultz in the William Holden feature film Stalag 17 (1953).

The film was remade as a 1989 TV movie, Breaking Point, starring Corbin Bernsen.

See also
 List of American films of 1965
 The Prisoner— 1960s Patrick McGoohan series with a somewhat similar premise

References

External links
 
 
 
 
 
 James Garner Interview on the Charlie Rose Show 
 James Garner Interview at Archive of American Television

1965 films
Films scored by Dimitri Tiomkin
Films about amnesia
Films based on short fiction
Films based on works by Roald Dahl
Films directed by George Seaton
Films set in 1944
Metro-Goldwyn-Mayer films
Operation Overlord films
World War II prisoner of war films
Films set in Germany
Films shot in California
American World War II films
Films produced by William Perlberg
1960s English-language films
1960s American films